Sainte-Foy station is a Via Rail station in Quebec City, Quebec, Canada. it is located on Chemin de la Gare in the former city of Sainte-Foy. It is staffed and is wheelchair-accessible. The stations offers limited parking with three accessible spots.

It opened in 1976 as the Canadian National Railway's passenger station in the Quebec City region after downtown's Gare du Palais was closed. Canadian Pacific Railway passengers used a station in Cadorna. When Via Rail took over most passenger service in 1979, Sainte-Foy was the sole intercity rail station in the Quebec City area from 1979 to 1985, when Gare du Palais reopened.

It is served by Corridor trains coming to and from Ottawa, and is also the Quebec City area stop for The Ocean/L'Océan, Via's long-distance train to Atlantic Canada.

Transit Connections
The station is served by Réseau de transport de la Capitale bus route 76.

References

External links

Buildings and structures in Quebec City
Transport in Quebec City
Via Rail stations in Quebec